Events from the year 1681 in Sweden

Incumbents
 Monarch – Charles XI

Events

 The city of Sundsvall burns down.
 The court of the Great Reversion begins its activity and starts its confiscations of the property of the nobility.
 Twelve Jews convert to Christianity in the German Church in Stockholm, which attracts so great attention and propaganda value that the members of the royal family attends as witnesses.

Births

 Hedvig Sophia of Sweden, princess (died 1708)

Deaths

 Nicodemus Tessin the Elder, architect (born 1615)

References

 
Years of the 17th century in Sweden
Sweden